Tequila Avión (NOM 1416, DOT 138) is produced in Jalisco, Mexico, from the Agave grown at the highest elevations. Tequila Avión won multiple awards in the 2011 and 2012 San Francisco World Spirits Competition. The drink's parent company was founded by Ken Austin and aviation entrepreneur Kenny Dichter in 2009.

Products
 Avión Silver
 Avión Reposado
 Avión Anejo
 Avión Espresso
 Avión Reserva 44

In popular culture
Tequila Avión was featured in multiple episodes on HBO's show Entourage throughout seasons 7 and 8.  Avión received this promotional spot for free. Avión was also featured in the 2015 motion picture ENTOURAGE. The story of the Avión brand was disclosed in a comprehensive article in New York's Resident magazine.

Awards
 2012 Best Tasting Unaged White Spirit San Francisco World Spirits Competition
 2012 Best Tasting Tequila San Francisco World Spirits Competition
 2012 Double Gold San Francisco World Spirits Competition
 2011 Gold Medal San Francisco World Spirits Competition
 2011 Silver Medal San Francisco World Spirits Competition

References

Tequila
Alcoholic drink brands